Myospila bimaculata is a fly from the family Muscidae.

References

Muscidae
Diptera of Europe
Insects described in 1834
Taxa named by Pierre-Justin-Marie Macquart